Ceratolimon is a genus of flowering plants belonging to the family Plumbaginaceae.

Its native range is Northwestern Africa, Southern Yemen, and Somaliland.

Species:

Ceratolimon feei 
Ceratolimon migiurtinum 
Ceratolimon weygandiorum

References

Plumbaginaceae
Caryophyllales genera